Wardell "Junior" Smith (born April 18, 1973) is a former Canadian football running back who played one season with the Shreveport Pirates of the Canadian Football League. He played college football at East Carolina University. He finished his college career with 3,745 rushing yards and 27 rushing touchdowns. He also recorded 58 receptions and one receiving touchdown. Smith has also been running backs coach for the Army Black Knights Louisiana–Monroe Warhawks and East Carolina Pirates.

References

External links
Just Sports Stats
College stats

Living people
1973 births
American football running backs
Canadian football running backs
African-American players of American football
African-American players of Canadian football
East Carolina Pirates football players
Shreveport Pirates players
Army Black Knights football coaches
Louisiana–Monroe Warhawks football coaches
East Carolina Pirates football coaches
21st-century African-American sportspeople
20th-century African-American sportspeople